Daşoguz Region (formerly Daşhowuz) is one of the regions of Turkmenistan.  It is in the north of the country, bordering Uzbekistan. The area of the province is 73,430 square kilometers, and the total population is 1,370,400 (2005 est.).  The capital is Daşoguz.

The region is mostly desert, and is experiencing severe environmental degradation as a result of the Aral Sea ecological catastrophe. Increased soil salinity has ruined thousands of square kilometers of farmland.

The region contains the UNESCO World Heritage Site of Köneürgenç and the archaeological site, Butentau.

Administrative subdivisions

Districts
As of 9 November 2022 Dashoguz Province (Daşoguz welaýaty) is subdivided into 7 districts (etrap, plural etraplar):

Akdepe
Boldumsaz
Görogly (formerly Tagta)
Köneurgenç
Ruhubelent
Shabat (formerly S.A. Nyýazow adyndaky)
Saparmyrat Türkmenbaşy

The former districts of Gubadag and of Gurbansoltan eje adyndaky were abolished in November 2022.

Municipalities
As of January 1, 2017, the province included 9 cities (şäherler), one town (şäherçe), 134 rural or village councils (geňeşlikler), and 612 villages (obalar). By parliamentary decree of 9 November 2022, the number of towns was increased to seven by upgrading some villages, and Köneurgenç's district status was revoked.

In the list below, the city with "district status" is bolded:
 Akdepe
 Andalyp (formerly Gurbansoltan Eje)
 Boldumsaz
 Dashoguz
 Görogly
 Gubadag
 Köneurgenç
 Shabat (formerly Nyýazow)
 Saparmyrat Türkmenbaşy adyndaky

The list below is of municipalities in Dashoguz Region with town status.

 Akjadepe şäherçesi
 Bereket şäherçesi
 Gökçäge şäherçesi
 Orazgeldi Ärsaryýew adyndaky şäherçe
 Rejepguly Ataýew adyndaky şäherçe
 Ruhubelent şäherçesi
 Sadylla Rozmetow adyndaky şäherçe

Economy

Agriculture

Industry

See also
 OpenStreetMap Wiki: Dashoguz Province
 Map of Districts (Etraplar) of Dashoguz Province

References

 
Regions of Turkmenistan